The cockchafer, colloquially called Maybug, Maybeetle, or doodlebug, is the name given to any of the European beetles of the genus Melolontha, in the family Scarabaeidae.

Once abundant throughout Europe and a major pest in the periodical years of "mass flight", it had been nearly eradicated in the middle of the 20th century through the agricultural intensification and has even been locally exterminated in many regions. However, since pest control was increasingly regulated in the 1980s, its numbers have started to grow again.

Taxonomy
There are three species of European cockchafers:

The common cockchafer, Melolontha melolontha
The forest cockchafer, Melolontha hippocastani
The large cockchafer, Melolontha pectoralis, rarer and less widespread than the other two species.

Description
Adults of the common cockchafer reach sizes of 25–30 mm; the forest cockchafer is a little smaller (20–25 mm). The two species can best be distinguished by the form of their tail end: it is long and slender in the common cockchafer, but shorter and knob-shaped at the end in the forest. Both have a brown colour. Male cockchafers have seven "leaves" on their antennae, whereas the females have only six.

Using soil bioacoustics, larvae of the common cockchafer (Melolontha melolontha) and the forest cockchafer (M. hippocastani) can be distinguished by a buzzing sound that they make by rubbing their mandibles together. Stridulation appears to be species-specific.  Isolated larva rarely make noise, but those in the same area make lots of noise. It has been suggested that the behavior may warn grubs of competition for the available food supply.

The species M. pectoralis looks similar, but its pygidium is rounded. The cockchafer should not be confused with the similar European chafer (Rhizotrogus majalis), which has a completely different life cycle, nor with the June beetles (Phyllophaga spp.), which are native to North America, nor with the summer chafer (or "European June bug", Amphimallon solstitiale), which emerges in June and has a two-year life cycle. (All of these are Scarabaeidae, have white grubs, and are turf pests.)

Life cycle

Adults appear at the end of April or in May and live for about five to seven weeks. After about two weeks, the female begins laying eggs, which she buries about 10 to 20 cm deep in the earth. She may do this several times until she has laid between 60 and 80 eggs. The common cockchafer lays its eggs in fields, whereas the Forest Cockchafer stays in the vicinity of the trees. The preferred food for adults is oak leaves, but they will also feed on conifer needles.

The larvae, known as "white grubs" or "chafer grubs", hatch after four to six weeks. They feed on plant roots, for instance potato roots. The grubs develop in the earth for three to four years, in colder climates even five years, and grow continually to a size of about 4–5 cm, before they pupate in early autumn and develop into an adult cockchafer in six weeks.

The cockchafer overwinters in the earth at depths between 20 and 100 cm. They work their way to the surface only in spring.

Because of their long development time as larvae, cockchafers appear in a cycle of every three or four years; the years vary from region to region. There is a larger cycle of around 30 years superimposed, in which they occur (or rather, used to occur) in unusually high numbers (10,000s).

Pest control and history

Middle ages 
In the Middle Ages, pest control was rare, and people had no effective means to protect their harvest. This gave rise to events that seem bizarre from a modern perspective. In 1320, for instance, cockchafers were brought to court in Avignon and sentenced to withdraw within three days onto a specially designated area, otherwise they would be outlawed. Subsequently, since they failed to comply, they were collected and killed. (Similar animal trials also occurred for many other animals in the Middle Ages.)

19th century 
Both the grubs and adults have a voracious appetite and thus have been and sometimes continue to be a major problem in agriculture and forestry. In  the pre-industrialized era, the main mechanism to control their numbers was to collect and kill the adult beetles, thereby interrupting the cycle. They were once very abundant: in 1911, more than 20 million individuals were collected in 18 km2 of forest. Collecting adults was an only moderately successful method. 

In some areas and times, cockchafers were served as food. A 19th-century recipe from France for cockchafer soup reads: "roast one pound of cockchafers without wings and legs in sizzling butter, then cook them in a chicken soup, add some veal liver and serve with chives on a toast". A German newspaper from Fulda from the 1920s tells of students eating sugar-coated cockchafers. Cockchafer larvae can also be fried or cooked over open flames, although they require some preparation by soaking in vinegar in order to purge them of soil in their digestive tracts. A cockchafer stew is referred to in W. G. Sebald's novel The Emigrants.

In Sweden the peasants looked upon the grub of the Cock-chafer, Melolontha vulgaris, as furnishing an unfailing prognostic whether the ensuing winter will be mild or severe; if the animal has a bluish hue (a circumstance which arises from its being replete with food), they affirm it will be mild, but on the contrary if it is white, the weather will be severe: and they carry this so far as to foretell, that if the anterior be white and the posterior blue, the cold will be most severe at the beginning of the winter. Hence they call this grub Bemärkelse-mask—prognostic worm.

Modern times 
Only with the modernization of agriculture in the 20th century and the invention of chemical pesticides did it become possible to effectively combat the cockchafer. Combined with the transformation of many pastures into agricultural land, this has resulted in a decrease of the cockchafer to near-extinction in some areas in Europe in the 1970s. 

Since the 1970s, agriculture has generally reduced its use of pesticides. Because of environmental and public health concerns (pesticides may enter the food chain and thus also the human body) many chemical pesticides have been phased out in the European Union and worldwide.

At present, no chemical pesticides are approved for use against cockchafers, and only biological measures are utilised for control: for instance, pathogenic fungi (such as Beauveria bassiana Spp. or Metarhizium) or nematodes that kill the grubs are applied to the soil.

Name
The name "cockchafer" derives from late 17th century usage of "cock" (in the sense of expressing size or vigour) + "chafer" which simply means an insect of this type, referring to its propensity for gnawing and damaging plants. 
The term "chafer" has its root in Old English ceafor or cefer, of Germanic origin and is related to the Dutch kever, all of which mean "gnawer" as it relates to the jaw. As such, the name "cockchafer" can be understood to mean "large plant-gnawing beetle" and is applicable to its history as a pest animal.

In culture
Children since antiquity have played with cockchafers. In ancient Greece, boys caught the insect, tied a linen thread to its feet and set it free, amusing themselves to watch it fly in spirals. English boys in Victorian times played a very similar game by sticking a pin through one of its wings. Nikola Tesla recalls that as a child he made one of his first "inventions"—an "engine" made by harnessing four cockchafers in this fashion.

Cockchafers appear in the fairy tales "Thumbelina" by Hans Christian Andersen and "Princess Rosette" by Madame d'Aulnoy.

The cockchafer is featured in a German children's rhyme similar to the English Ladybird, Ladybird:

The verse dates back to the Thirty Years' War in the first half of the 17th Century, in which Pomerania was pillaged and suffered heavily. Since World War II, it is associated in Germany also with the closing months of that war, when Soviet troops advanced into eastern Germany.

The cockchafer was the basis for the "fifth trick" in the well-known illustrated German book Max and Moritz, dating from 1865.

The dumbledore in Thomas Hardy's 1899 poem An August Midnight is a cockchafer.

Jim Dixon, in Kingsley Amis's comic novel Lucky Jim (1954), repeatedly calls his department head, Professor Welch, an "old cockchafer".

The Italian – specifically Neapolitan – collection of stories Il Pentamerone of Giambattista Basile (in its English translation by Norman M. Penzer from Benedetto Croce's Italian) contains a tale on Day 3, Night 5: "The Cockchafer, Mouse and Grasshopper".

In J. G. Farrell's 1970 novel, The Siege of Krishnapur, there is a memorable invasion of cockchafers. As the colonists sequester together in a large room having tea, a black cloud enters through an open window and the hostess Lucy is covered from head to toe in insects. To remedy the situation, she is stripped naked and then scraped with the torn-off covers of a Bible.

There have been four Royal Navy ships named .

See also
 Red-headed cockchafer, native to Australia

Explanatory notes

Citations

External links

 Der Maikäfer, from the Senckenberg Museum in Frankfurt 

Beetles described in 1758
Taxa named by Carl Linnaeus
Beetles of Europe
Melolonthinae
Insect common names